Palpita homalia is a moth in the family Crambidae. It was described by Inoue in 1996. It is found in Japan (Ryukyu Islands) and Taiwan.

References

Palpita
Moths described in 1996
Moths of Japan
Moths of Taiwan